Seyyed Musa Zarabadi-e Qazvini (1877, Qazvin - 1935, Qazvin)   was one of the shia Marja and mystic.

See also
List of deceased Maraji

References 

Iranian ayatollahs
People from Qazvin
1877 births
1935 deaths